Prosopea is a genus of flies in the family Tachinidae.

Species
P. nigricans (Egger, 1861)

References

Exoristinae
Diptera of Asia
Tachinidae genera
Taxa named by Camillo Rondani